Alex Baird or Alexander Baird may refer to:

Sir Alexander Baird, 1st Baronet (1849–1920), Lord-Lieutenant of Kincardineshire and philanthropist in Egypt
Alexander Boyd Baird (1891–1967), Canadian Senator
Alex Baird (footballer), played in 2012–13 Dundee F.C. season
Alex Baird, drummer in The Jags